Christopher Andrew Hammond (born January 21, 1966) is a former left-handed pitcher in Major League Baseball.

Hammond was drafted by the Cincinnati Reds in the sixth round of the  amateur draft. Hammond had not sustained considerable success until his revival as a relief pitcher with the  Atlanta Braves. Hammond's career went through two distinct phases, one as a struggling starting pitcher/swingman and one as a reliever. Hammond used techniques common to "junkball" or finesse pitchers. His pitches included the changeup (Hammond's ranged from 58 - 71 mph), his mostly flat slider, and his low 80s four-seam fastball. Hammond was also a relatively good left-handed hitter as shown by his career .202 batting average, .285 on-base percentage, and four career home runs.

Professional baseball career

Cincinnati Reds
Hammond first appeared in the Major Leagues in  where he pitched three games for the Reds. The following season was his official rookie season and he started 18 games posting a 7-7 record with a respectable 4.06 ERA. His first stint with the Reds would come to a close in late March  as he was traded to the Florida Marlins for Héctor Carrasco and Gary Scott.

Florida Marlins
Hammond was a member of the inaugural Marlins team that began play in Major League Baseball in 1993. In his inaugural season as a Marlin, he hit two home runs (one a pinch-hit grand slam), and pitched his way to a 4.66 ERA in 191 innings. In , he experienced somewhat more success (a 3.07 ERA) in a season shortened by injuries. After a mediocre  season, Hammond's career seemed to hit a nosedive.

Boston Red Sox
Instead, Hammond was utilized as a relief pitcher. In an interview in Yankees' magazine during 2002, Hammond revealed that the Red Sox offered this promise as a ruse to sign him. While Hammond's career was seemingly reaching its end, the Florida Marlins won the 1997 World Series.

Return and retirement
After being signed to a contract by the Kansas City Royals, he was granted his release towards the end of spring training. Just as they did in 1993, the Marlins signed him to be a starting pitcher. Hammond returned to the Major Leagues for three starts, compiling a 6.56 ERA in 13.2 innings. After this brief comeback attempt, Hammond had shoulder surgery and he retired for the first time. Hammond returned to a quiet family life in Randolph County, Alabama, where he purchased a 200+ acre horse-ranch with a  lake.

Comeback: Atlanta Braves
Hammond returned in 2001 as a minor league player for the Cleveland Indians. At mid-season, he was released by the Indians and then signed to a minor league contract with the Atlanta Braves. Hammond was on Atlanta's major league roster in 2002. In 2002, Hammond pitched 76.0 innings in 63 games while posting a 0.95 ERA. Hammond became the fourth pitcher at that point in time to ever post an ERA below 1.00 while pitching over a full season with over an inning an appearance. Hammond also had a streak of nearly thirty consecutive scoreless innings during the season that helped him achieve this historic mark. At the end of the season, the New York Yankees signed Hammond to a multi-year contract.  While with the Braves, he continued to live in Randolph County, Alabama and commuted back and forth to Atlanta.

New York Yankees
Hammond replaced the incumbent Mike Stanton as the left-handed setup man in the Yankees' bullpen. Joe Torre tried to use Hammond as a left-handed specialist because the bullpen lacked other left-handed pitchers. Hammond allowed the lowest percentage of inherited runners to score in the 2003 Yankees bullpen while posting a 2.86 ERA. He only had one appearance during the 2003 postseason, pitching two innings without allowing an earned run during the World Series while facing the Marlins.

Oakland Athletics
Hammond was traded to the Oakland Athletics during the 2003 off-season. Hammond missed some time during the season due to a recurrence of shoulder injuries, but was able to post a 2.68 ERA in 41 appearances.

San Diego Padres
In , Hammond signed with the San Diego Padres. Hammond had posted a WHIP under 1.00 until shoulder injuries nagged him once again. Hammond would finish the season with an ERA of 3.84 in 55 appearances.

Reds: 2006
Hammond returned to Cincinnati in 2006, where his career started; however, this was short-lived, as he was released on July 12. Hammond would end his 2006 season with a 6.91 ERA in 28.2 innings pitched.

Personal life
Chris resides in Oxford, Alabama with his wife, Lynne. They have two sons and one daughter, Andy, Jake, and Alex.  He has started the Chris Hammond Youth Foundation, a Christian-based charity, and is active in his church.

References

External links

Baseball players from Atlanta
Atlanta Braves players
Boston Red Sox players
Cincinnati Reds players
Florida Marlins players
New York Yankees players
Oakland Athletics players
San Diego Padres players
Major League Baseball pitchers
1966 births
Living people
People from Randolph County, Alabama
Chattanooga Lookouts players
Nashville Sounds players
Charlotte Knights players
Buffalo Bisons (minor league) players
Richmond Braves players
Sacramento River Cats players
Tampa Tarpons (1957–1987) players
Portland Sea Dogs players
Brevard County Manatees players
Gulf Coast Reds players
Gulf Coast State Commodores baseball players
UAB Blazers baseball players
People from Oxford, Alabama
Charlotte 49ers baseball players